The 1992–93 Rugby Football League season was the 98th ever season of professional rugby league football in Britain. Sixteen teams competed from August, 1992 until May, 1993 for the Stones Bitter Championship, Premiership Trophy and Silk Cut Challenge Cup.

Season summary
Stones Bitter League Champions: Wigan
Silk Cut Challenge Cup Winners: Wigan (20-14 v Widnes)
Stones Bitter Premiership Trophy Winners: St. Helens (10-4 v Wigan)
Harry Sunderland Trophy: Chris Joynt
1992–93 Regal Trophy Winners: Wigan (15-8 v Bradford Northern)
2nd Division Champions: Featherstone Rovers

The 1993 Man of Steel Award for player of the season went to Wigan's Andy Platt.

Wigan beat St. Helens 5–4 to win the 1992 Lancashire Cup, and Wakefield Trinity beat Sheffield Eagles 29–16 to win the Yorkshire County Cup, to date this was final season of the Lancashire Cup and Yorkshire Cup competitions that, except for the break for World War I and World War II (Lancashire Cup only), had taken place annually since their inaugural 1905–06 season.

League Tables

Championship

Second Division

Third Division

Challenge Cup

The 1993 Silk Cut Challenge Cup Final was played by Wigan and Widnes on 2:30 on a warm and sunny Saturday afternoon, 1 May 1993 at Wembley Stadium, London in front of 77,684. By coming on as a substitute in this game at 17 years and 11 months of age, Andy Farrell become the youngest player to win a Challenge Cup final. The winner of the Lance Todd Trophy was Wigan's Dean Bell.

League Cup

Premiership

Rugby League World Cup Final

On 24 October, the Final of the 1989-92 Rugby League World Cup took place at Wembley Stadium between Great Britain and Australia. In front of a record international attendance of 73,631, The Kangaroos triumphed 10–6.

Prior to the Final, the Australian team embarked on a mini 3 game tour as a warm up and selection trial.

References

Sources
1992–93 Rugby Football League season at rlhalloffame.org.uk
1992–93 Rugby Football League season at wigan.rlfans.com
Wigan's record Cup run at news.bbc.co.uk
Great Britain Competitions 1992-1993 at hunterlink.net.au
Championship 1992/93 at rugbyleagueproject.org

1993 in English rugby league
1992 in English rugby league
Rugby Football League seasons